

Ta 
Tasovčići

Te 
Tepčići, Teskera, Tešanj

Ti 
Tihaljina, Tinje

To 
Tošćanica (municipality Prozor-Rama), Tovarnica

Tr 
Travnik, Trebeševo, Trebimlja (municipality Ravno),  Trebižat, Treboje, Trešnjevica, Trge, Tribistovo, Trijebanj (municipality Stolac(BiH)) Trn (Široki Brijeg), Trnčina (municipality Ravno), Trusina

Tu 
Tuhobići, Tupačići, Turbe, Turčinovići (Široki Brijeg), Turija, Tuzla

Lists of settlements in the Federation of Bosnia and Herzegovina (A-Ž)